Carolina Albuquerque (born 25 July 1977) is a retired volleyball player from Brazil.

Career
Albuquerque won the bronze medal in the 2014 FIVB Club World Championship after her team defeated the Swiss club Voléro Zürich 3-2 .

Clubs
  Grêmio Náutico União (1991–1993)
  Pinheiros (1995–2001)
  Osasco (2001–2002)
  Macaé Sports (2002–2004)
  Osasco (2004–2006)
  Macaé Sports (2006–2007)
  Osasco (2007–2011)
  UCAM Voley Murcia (2011–2012)
  SESI-São Paulo (2012–2015)
  Osasco (2016–2019)
  P.A.O.K. (2019–2020)
  Osasco (2020–2021)

Awards

Clubs
 2001/02 Brazilian Superliga -  Runner up, with BCN/Osasco
 2004/05 Brazilian Superliga -  Champion, with Finasa/Osasco
 2005/06 Brazilian Superliga -  Runner up, with Finasa/Osasco
 2007/08 Brazilian Superliga -  Runner up, with Finasa/Osasco
 2008/09 Brazilian Superliga -  Runner up, with Finasa/Osasco
 2009/10 Brazilian Superliga -  Champion, with Sollys Osasco
 2013/14 Brazilian Superliga -  Runner up, with SESI-SP
 2016/17 Brazilian Superliga -  Runner up, with Vôlei Nestlé
 2010 FIVB Club World Championship -  Runner up, with Sollys Osasco
 2014 FIVB Club World Championship -  Bronze medal, with SESI-SP

Individuals
 2009 South American Club Championship "Best Setter"
 2010 South American Club Championship "Best Setter"
 2010 FIVB Club World Championship "Best Setter"

References

External links
 Athlete bio at 2008 Olympics website

1977 births
Living people
Brazilian women's volleyball players
Brazilian expatriate sportspeople in Switzerland
Volleyball players at the 2008 Summer Olympics
Olympic volleyball players of Brazil
Olympic gold medalists for Brazil
Volleyball players at the 2007 Pan American Games
Olympic medalists in volleyball
Medalists at the 2008 Summer Olympics
Pan American Games medalists in volleyball
Pan American Games silver medalists for Brazil
Setters (volleyball)
Expatriate volleyball players in Switzerland
Medalists at the 2007 Pan American Games
Sportspeople from Porto Alegre
21st-century Brazilian women